Al-Rashadah is a sub-district located in the Al Malagim District, Al Bayda Governorate, Yemen. Al-Rashadah had a population of 5244 according to the 2004 census.

References 

Sub-districts in Al Malagim District